Pristimantis loustes is a species of frog in the family Strabomantidae.
It is found in Colombia and Ecuador.
Its natural habitats are tropical moist montane forests and rivers.
It is threatened by habitat loss.

References

loustes
Amphibians of Colombia
Amphibians of Ecuador
Amphibians described in 1979
Taxonomy articles created by Polbot